Bell TV may refer to:

 Bell Fibe TV, an IP-based television service offered by Bell Canada in the Canadian provinces of Ontario and Quebec
 Bell Mobile TV, a former mobile television service available to Bell Mobility and Virgin Mobile Canada customers
 Bell Satellite TV, which provides satellite television service in Canada

See also 
 Virgin TV, an IP-based television and Internet service bundle offered by Bell Canada with Virgin branding